Micheldever railway station, in the village of Micheldever Station, serves Micheldever (approximately  to the south) and the surrounding area in Hampshire, England. It is a flint building with an added veranda. The station is on the South West Main Line,  down the line from  towards Southampton and is managed by South Western Railway.

History
It was originally called "Andover Road" until Andover got its own station. Following the construction of the station, a cluster of houses and small shops (including the Canada Stores) were attracted to the area, creating the village known as Micheldever Station. No shops remain, though there is a tyre merchant and trailer supplier trading there.

Electrification
Just prior to electrification of the line in 1967 the track layout was changed when the two side platforms were replaced by an island platform between the tracks.

Service patterns
Generally a train leaves hourly in each direction. 
Trains towards London Waterloo call at Basingstoke, Farnborough (Main) (Mondays-Saturdays only), Woking (every day) and Clapham Junction (Sundays only).
Trains towards Portsmouth Harbour call at Winchester, Eastleigh, Hedge End, Botley, Fareham, Portchester, Cosham, Hilsea, Fratton and Portsmouth and Southsea. On Sundays they call at Winchester, Shawford (every two hours) and Eastleigh, where the train divides:
The front part of the train runs to Poole, calling at Southampton Airport Parkway, Southampton Central, Totton, Ashurst New Forest, Beaulieu Road, Brockenhurst, Sway, New Milton, Hinton Admiral, Christchurch, Pokesdown and Bournemouth. The rear part of the train travels to Portsmouth as described above.

Goods yard
There is a  goods yard which served a Royal Air Force fuel and oil depot (part of the Government Pipelines and Storage System) built circa 1939 and closed circa 1995. The yard is still (2018) in use for rolling stock storage.

Bus service
A local bus service to Winchester is provided by Mervyn's Coaches, but with only one trip in each direction on weekdays. There is no bus service at weekends.

Gallery

References

 
 
 
 Station on navigable O.S. map

External Links

Railway stations in Hampshire
DfT Category E stations
Railway stations in Great Britain opened in 1840
Former London and South Western Railway stations
Railway stations served by South Western Railway